The Fever is a novel by American writer Megan Abbott first published in 2014 by Little, Brown and Company. It is Abbott's seventh novel.

Abbott was inspired to write the novel by the 2012 LeRoy, New York Mass hysteria case.

Plot
Deenie Nash is a diligent student with a close-knit family: her brother, Eli, is a hockey star and her father is a popular teacher. But when Deenie's best friend is struck by a terrifying, unexplained seizure in the middle of class, the Nashes' seeming stability dissolves into chaos.

Soon more local girls start to experience bizarre symptoms, leaving health officials puzzled and parents in an uproar. As hysteria and contagion swell, a series of tightly held secrets emerges, threatening to unravel friendships, families, and the town's fragile idea of security.

Reception
The Fever was generally well received by critics, including starred reviews from Booklist, Kirkus Reviews, and Library Journal. Booklist called the book "a powerful portrait of community, with interesting echoes of The Crucible." Kirkus wrote, "Nothing should be taken at face value in this jealousy- and hormone-soaked world except that Abbott is certainly our very best guide." Library Journal said The Fever was Abbott's best novel to date.

The New York Times described Abbott as "a skilled storyteller," and The Fever as "a gripping and unsettling novel."

Publishers Weekly wrote, "Abbott’s adolescents are close to pitch-perfect with their sudden switches between childlike vulnerability and calculating maturity," though mentioned "the narrative lacks in depth." Ultimately, they called the novel "a gripping story fueled by the razor-sharp treachery, jealousy, hormones, and insecurities of teenage girls."

Entertainment Weekly gave the book a B+ grade.

References

2014 American novels
Little, Brown and Company books